Daniel Mendelsohn (born 1960), is an American author, essayist, critic, columnist, and translator. Best known for his internationally best-selling and award-winning Holocaust family memoir The Lost: A Search for Six of Six Million, he is currently the Charles Ranlett Flint Professor of Humanities at Bard College, the Editor at Large of the New York Review of Books, and the Director of the Robert B. Silvers Foundation, a charitable organization dedicated to supporting writers of nonfiction.

Early life and education
Mendelsohn was born to a Jewish family in New York City and raised on Long Island in the town of Old Bethpage, New York. He attended the University of Virginia from 1978 to 1982 as an Echols Scholar, graduating with a B.A. summa cum laude in Classics. From 1982 to 1985, he resided in New York City, working as an assistant to an opera impresario, Joseph A. Scuro. The following year he began graduate studies at Princeton University, receiving his M.A. in 1989 and his Ph.D. in 1994. His dissertation, later published as a scholarly monograph by Oxford University Press, was on Euripidean tragedy.

Mendelsohn is one of five siblings. His brothers include film director Eric Mendelsohn and Matt Mendelsohn, a photographer; his sister, Jennifer Mendelsohn, also a journalist, is the founder of "#ResistanceGenealogy". He is the nephew of the psychologist Allan Rechtschaffen. He is gay.

Career
While still a graduate student, Mendelsohn began contributing reviews, op-eds, and essays to such publications as QW, Out, The New York Times, The Nation, and The Village Voice; after completing his Ph.D., he moved to New York City and began writing full-time. Since then his review-essays on books, films, theater and television have appeared frequently in numerous major publications, most often in The New Yorker and The New York Review of Books. Others include Town & Country (magazine), The New York Times Magazine,  Travel + Leisure, Newsweek, Esquire, The Paris Review, The New Republic, and Harper's magazine, where Mendelsohn was a culture columnist. Between 2000 and 2002 he was the weekly book critic for New York Magazine; his reviews have also appeared frequently in The New York Times Book Review, where he was also a columnist for the "Bookends" page.

Mendelsohn is the author of eight books, including New York Times bestseller and international bestseller The Lost: A Search for Six of Six Million. He is currently at work on a new translation of Homer's The Odyssey for the University of Chicago Press, and his third collection of essays, Ecstasy and Terror: From the Greeks to Game of Thrones, covering subjects from Sappho and Virgil to television and films such as Ex Machina and Her to the fiction of Karl Ove Knausgaard and Hanya Yanagihara, will be published in October, 2019 by New York Review Books.

The New York Review of Books

Mendelsohn began contributing to the New York Review of Books early in 2000, and soon became a frequent contributor, publishing articles on a wide range of subjects including Greek drama and poetry, American and British theater, literature, television, and film. Over time he became a close personal friend of the founding editor Robert B. Silvers and Silvers' partner, Grace, Countess of Dudley.

During a period of editorial reorganization in the year and a half following Silvers' death, Mendelsohn was named the first Editor-at-Large of the Review, a position created for him by the publisher, Rea Hederman, to go alongside the editorship, which is currently split between co-editors Emily Greenhouse and Gabriel Winslow-Yost.

In February, 2019, Hederman also announced that Mendelsohn had been named Director of the Robert B. Silvers Foundation, as per a stipulation in Silvers' will. The Foundation is dedicated to supporting writers of nonfiction of the kind Silvers fostered at the Review: long-form criticism and journalism and writing on arts and culture.

Academic career and positions

Mendelsohn's academic speciality was Greek (especially Euripidean) tragedy; he has also published scholarly articles about Roman poetry and Greek religion. During the 1990s, he taught intermittently as a lecturer in the Classics department at Princeton University. In the fall of 2006 he was named to the Charles Ranlett Flint Chair in Humanities at Bard College, where he currently teaches one course each semester on literary subjects. His academic residencies have included the Richard Holbrooke Distinguished Visitor at the American Academy in Berlin, Germany (2008); Critic-in-Residence at the American Academy in Rome (2010), and Visiting writer at the Ca' Foscari University of Venice (2014). In March, 2019 he was in residence at the University of Virginia, where he gave the Page-Barbour Lectures.

Major works

An Odyssey: A Father, a Son, and an Epic (2017), a memoir intertwining a personal narrative about the author's late father, Jay, a retired research scientist who decided to enroll in his son's Spring, 2011 Odyssey seminar at Bard College, with reflections on the text of Homer's Odyssey and its theme of father-son relationships, education, and identity. The book, the third in which the author combines memoir and literary criticism, was published by Knopf in September 2017 to acclaim in the U.S., where it was named a Best Book of the Year by National Public Radio, Library Journal, Newsday, Kirkus Reviews, and The Christian Science Monitor, the U.K., where it was shortlisted for the Baillie Gifford Prize, and France, where it won the 2018 Prix Méditerranée.
C. P. Cavafy: Collected Poems and C. P. Cavafy: The Unfinished Poems, published simultaneously in March 2009.  Mendelsohn's translation of the complete poetry of the Alexandrian Greek poet Constantine Cavafy was a  Publishers Weekly Best Book of 2009 and was shortlisted for the Criticos Prize (now the London Hellenic Prize). The two-volume hardcover edition was published as a single-volume paperback by Vintage Books in May 2012; a selection was published in the Everyman's Library Pocket Poets series in 2014.
The Lost: A Search for Six of Six Million (2006), the story of the author's worldwide search over five years to learn about the fates of relatives who perished in the Holocaust, was published to wide acclaim in the US and throughout Europe. After the book's publication in a bestselling French translation, in 2007, film rights were optioned by director Jean-Luc Godard.
Gender and the City in Euripides' Political Plays, published by Oxford University Press in 2002, was the first scholarly study in fifty years of two lesser-known plays of Euripides, "Children of Heracles" and "Suppliant Women." A paperback edition was published in 2005.
The Elusive Embrace: Desire and the Riddle of Identity (Alfred A. Knopf, 1999), a memoir entwining themes of gay identity, family history, and Classical myth and literature, was named a New York Times Notable Book of the Year, and a Los Angeles Times Best Book of the Year.

Awards and honors

Mendelsohn has been the recipient of numerous prizes and honors both in the United States and abroad. Apart from awards for individual books, these include the American Academy of Arts and Letters Harold D. Vursell Memorial Prize for Prose Style (2014); the American Philological Association President's Award for service to the Classics (2014); the George Jean Nathan Prize for Drama Criticism (2002); and the National Book Critics Circle Award Citation for Excellence in Book Reviewing (2000)

 2022 Chevalier de l'ordre des Arts et des Lettres of the French Ministery of Culture
 2020 Prix du Meilleur Livre Étranger (Best Foreign Book Prize) for Trois Anneaux: Un conte d'exils (French translation of Three Rings)
 2018 Prix Méditerranée Étranger for Une odyssée (French translation of An Odyssey: A Father, a Son, and an Epic)
 2018 London Hellenic Prize (UK), shortlisted for An Odyssey: A Father, a Son, and an Epic
 2018 Princeton University James Madison Medal
 2017 Prix Transfuge for Une odyssée (French translation of An Odyssey: A Father, a Son, and an Epic)
 2017 Baillie Gifford Prize, shortlisted for An Odyssey: A Father, a Son, and an Epic
 2014 American Academy of Arts and Letters Harold D. Vursell Memorial Prize for Prose Style
 2013 PEN/Diamonstein-Spielvogel Award for the Art of the Essay, runner-up for Waiting for the Barbarians
 2012 Elected to the American Academy of Arts and Sciences
 2012 National Book Critics Circle Award, finalist for Waiting for the Barbarians
 2009 Criticos Prize (UK), shortlisted for C. P. Cavafy: Collected Poems
 2007 Prix Médicis (France) for Les Disparus (French translation of The Lost: A Search for Six of Six Million)
 2007 Premio ADEI-WIZO (Italy) for Gli Scomparsi (Italian translation of The Lost: A Search for Six of Six Million)
 2007 Duff Cooper Prize shortlisted for The Lost: A Search for Six of Six Million
2006 Elected to the American Philosophical Society
 2006 National Book Critics Circle Award winner, Memoir/Autobiography, for The Lost: A Search for Six of Six Million
 2006 National Jewish Book Award for The Lost: A Search for Six of Six Million
 2006 Salon Book Award for The Lost: A Search for Six of Six Million
 2006 Barnes & Noble "Discover" Prize, 2nd place, for The Lost: A Search for Six of Six Million
 2006 American Library Association Sophie Brody Medal for Outstanding Achievement in Jewish Literature, for The Lost: A Search for Six of Six Million
 2005 John Simon Guggenheim Fellowship for a translation of Constantine Cavafy's "Unfinished" poems, with commentary.
 2002 George Jean Nathan Prize for Drama Criticism
 2000 National Book Critics Circle Award Nona Balakian Citation for Excellence in Book Reviewing

Bibliography

Books
 
 
 
 
 
 
 
 
 An Odyssey: A Father, a Son, and an Epic, Knopf, 2017.
 The Bad Boy of Athens: Musing on Culture from Sappho to Spider-Man, William Collins, July 2019
 Ecstasy and Terror: From the Greeks to Game of Thrones, New York Review Books, October 2019
 Three Rings: A Tale of Exile, Narrative, and Fate, University of Virginia Press, September 2020
 Homer: The Odyssey. Translated, with Introduction and Notes, by Daniel Mendelsohn. University of Chicago Press, Forthcoming October 2023.

Essays, reviews and reporting
 
 
 
 
 
 
 
 
 

See also lists of Mendelsohn's articles at New York Magazine, New York Review of Books, The New Yorker, The New York Times Book Review, The Paris Review, Town & Country, Harper's, Travel + Leisure.

References

External links

 Author's official website
 Bibliography of Holocaust Literature
 
 The Sigmund H. Danziger, Jr. Memorial Lecture in the Humanities
 The Discovery of Oneself: An Interview with Daniel Mendelsohn by Ioanna Kohler, The Paris Review, July 1, 2014
 "Waiting for the Barbarians by Daniel Mendelsohn – review", Christopher Bray, The Observer, January 5, 2013

1960 births
21st-century American essayists
American critics
American male journalists
American columnists
American male non-fiction writers
American gay writers
Jewish American writers
LGBT Jews
Living people
Princeton University alumni
Princeton University faculty
Prix Médicis étranger winners
Fellows of the American Academy of Arts and Sciences
Bard College faculty
People from Old Bethpage, New York
The New Yorker people
American male essayists
20th-century American journalists
20th-century American non-fiction writers
20th-century American male writers
21st-century American journalists
21st-century American non-fiction writers
21st-century American male writers
LGBT people from New York (state)
Members of the American Philosophical Society
21st-century American Jews
21st-century LGBT people
Translators of Homer